Abdolhamid Akbarzadeh Shafaroudi is an assistant professor in machine design, bioresource engineering, and mechanical engineering at McGill University. He currently holds the Canada Research Chair in Bio-inspired Hierarchical Multifunctional Metamaterials.

Early life and education
Akbarzadeh Shafaroudi completed a Bachelor of Science in mechanical engineering at Isfahan University of Technology in Iran in 2007, followed by a Master of Science in mechanical engineering at Amirkabir University of Technology in Iran in 2009. In 2013, he completed a Doctor of Philosophy (Ph.D.) in mechanical engineering at the University of New Brunswick, followed by NSERC-funded post-doctoral training in mechanical engineering at McGill University.

References

Academic staff of McGill University
McGill University Faculty of Engineering alumni
University of New Brunswick alumni
Amirkabir University of Technology alumni
Canada Research Chairs
Iranian Canadian
Year of birth missing (living people)
Living people